The Hec Crighton Trophy (sometimes referred to as the Hec Crighton Award) is awarded annually to the most outstanding Canadian football player in U Sports. The trophy is named after the late Hec Crighton - teacher, coach, referee, and author of the Official Football Rule Book and the U Sports Rule Book. It was first presented in 1967 by the board of directors of the Canadian College Bowl.  

It is the Canadian equivalent to the American NCAA Heisman Trophy. 

The Western Mustangs program has produced the most Hec Crighton winners with seven as well as the most individual winners with six (Tim Tindale won the award twice). Chris Flynn has won the Hec Crighton Trophy three times, consecutively, while no other player has won the award more than twice. 

Of the 27 active U Sports football programs, eight teams have not had a player win the award.

List of winners

See also
J. P. Metras Trophy
Presidents' Trophy
Peter Gorman Trophy
Russ Jackson Award
 Jon Cornish Trophy – similar award presented to the top Canadian player in NCAA (American) football

References

External links
 

U Sports football trophies and awards